Gilla na Naemh Ua Duinn (1102 – 17 December 1160) was an Irish poet, historian, and cleric.

The Annals of the Four Masters describe him as:

"lector of Inis-Clothrann, a paragon in history and poetry, and a good speaker, sent his spirit to his heavenly patrimony, amid a choir of angels, on the 17th of December, in the fifty-eighth year of his age."

Inis Clothran is an island located in the northern part of Lough Ree, on the River Shannon. It contains the remains of a monastery of which Ua Duinn was lector.

External links
 Data
 Surname

12th-century Irish historians
People from County Roscommon
People from County Longford
1102 births
1160 deaths
12th-century Irish Roman Catholic priests
12th-century Irish poets
Irish male poets